James C. Spindler is an American lawyer, currently the Sylvan Lang Professor of Law at University of Texas at Austin, and also a published author.  Previously, Spindler taught at the University of Southern California and practiced in the New York and Hong Kong offices of Cravath, Swaine & Moore in its securities and banking groups. He holds a J.D. from Harvard Law School, a Ph.D. in Economics from the University of California, Los Angeles, and an A.B. in Political Economy from Princeton University.

References

Year of birth missing (living people)
Living people
University of Texas at Austin faculty
Texas lawyers
University of Southern California faculty
Harvard Law School alumni
Princeton University alumni
University of California, Los Angeles alumni
Cravath, Swaine & Moore people